Peripsocus didymus is a species of Psocoptera from the Peripsocidae family that can be found in Great Britain and Ireland. It can also be found in Austria, Belgium, Finland, France, Germany, Hungary, Italy, Luxembourg, Norway, Poland, Romania, Spain, Sweden, Switzerland, and the Netherlands. The species are brown coloured.

Habitat 
The species feed on beech, bird cherry, blackthorn, broom, elder, hawthorn, ivy, larch, laurel, oak, pine, spruce, sycamore, and yew. It also likes to feed on lime.

References 

Peripsocidae
Insects described in 1939
Psocoptera of Europe